George Jones was a British sports shooter. He competed in the 50 m rifle event at the 1948 Summer Olympics.

References

External links
 

Year of birth missing
Possibly living people
British male sport shooters
Olympic shooters of Great Britain
Shooters at the 1948 Summer Olympics
Place of birth missing